Lastours is a commune in the Aude department in southern France.

Lastours is located  outside Carcassonne, in the valley of the Orbiel. There are four small castles each built on a large 300 m high rocky ridge. The castles were built to control the access to Montagne Noire and the Cabardes region. These are some of the few original Cathar castles left.

Population

See also
Communes of the Aude department

References

Communes of Aude
Aude communes articles needing translation from French Wikipedia